Plagiocephalus lobularis is a species of ulidiid or picture-winged fly in the genus Plagiocephalus of the family Ulidiidae.

References

Ulidiidae